"Assumption" is Samuel Beckett's first published story, appearing in Transition magazine in June 1929, in the same issue as James Joyce's Work in Progress.

Short stories by Samuel Beckett
1929 short stories